Kristiyan Petkov (born 19 August 1994) is a Bulgarian footballer who currently plays as a winger for Ustrem Donchevo.

Career statistics

Club

References

External links
 

1994 births
Living people
Bulgarian footballers
Bulgaria youth international footballers
First Professional Football League (Bulgaria) players
PFC Dobrudzha Dobrich players
FC Dunav Ruse players
PFC Marek Dupnitsa players
PFC Litex Lovech players
People from Dobrich
Association football wingers